From Birth to Burial is the seventh studio album by American alternative metal band 10 Years. The album was released on April 21, 2015, through their own independent label called Palehorse Records, which is a part of Warner Music Group's Independent Label Group.

Track listing

Personnel
Jesse Hasek – vocals
 Brian Vodinh – production, mixing, mastering, guitar, drums, programming, keys, backing vocals
 Ryan Collier – bass
 Ryan "Tater" Johnson – guitar

References

10 Years (band) albums
2015 albums